Jay Jacobs (born January 28, 1953) is an American politician from the Republican party who is a member of the Maryland House of Delegates.

Background 
Jacobs was born on January 28, 1953, in West Palm Beach, Florida. He attended Kent County High School in Worton, Maryland. Jacobs is a small business owner, serving as the owner of Jay A. Jacobs Complete Kitchens and Baths LLC since 1986.

Jacobs has worked in government since 1976, when he served as a member on the Planning and Zoning Board for the town of Rock Hall, Maryland. He was served as Mayor of Rock Hall from 1999 to 2011, and as the President of the Kent County Council of Governments from 2007 to 2010.

In 2006, Jacobs unsuccessfully ran for state delegate in District 36, losing to state delegate Mary Roe Walkup. In July 2009, Jacobs announced that he would once again run for state delegate, running unopposed in the Republican primary. He received 22.4 percent of the vote in the general election.

In the legislature 
Jacobs was sworn in as a member of House of Delegates on January 12, 2011.

Committee assignments 
 Environment and Transportation Committee, 2015–present (motor vehicle & transportation subcommittee, 2015–present; natural resources, agriculture & open space subcommittee, 2015–present)
 Joint Committee on Administrative, Executive and Legislative Review, 2015–present
 Environmental Matters Committee, 2011–2015 (agriculture, agriculture preservation, & open space subcommittee, 2011–2015; natural resources subcommittee, 2011–2015)

Other memberships 
 House Chair, Caroline County Delegation, 2011–present
 Kent County Delegation, 2011–present
 House Vice-Chair, Cecil County Delegation, 2021–present
 Chair, Republican Party Caucus, 2013–present
 Member, Maryland Legislative Sportsmen's Caucus, 2013–present

Electoral history

References 

1953 births
Living people
Republican Party members of the Maryland House of Delegates
21st-century American politicians